Madhuri Singh ( Chand; 13 January 1923 – 31 December 1989) was an Indian politician. She was elected to the Lok Sabha, lower house of the Parliament of India from Purnea, Bihar in 1980 and 1984 as a member of the Indian National Congress. Singh died in Patna on 31 December 1989, at the age of 66.

References

External links
 Official Biographical Sketch in Lok Sabha Website

1923 births
1989 deaths
India MPs 1980–1984
India MPs 1984–1989
Indian National Congress politicians
Lok Sabha members from Bihar
People from Purnia district
Indian National Congress politicians from Bihar